Kristi Kirshe (born October 14, 1994) is an American rugby sevens player.

Rugby career 
Kirshe made her debut with the U.S. Eagles sevens team in Sydney in 2019.
In 2021, she competed at the 2020 Summer Olympics in Tokyo.

References

External links 
 

Living people
1994 births
American female rugby sevens players
Rugby sevens players at the 2020 Summer Olympics
Olympic rugby sevens players of the United States
Pan American Games medalists in rugby sevens
Pan American Games silver medalists for the United States
Rugby sevens players at the 2019 Pan American Games
Medalists at the 2019 Pan American Games